Gig workers are independent contractors, online platform workers, contract firm workers, on-call workers, and temporary workers. Gig workers enter into formal agreements with on-demand companies to provide services to the company's clients.

In many countries, the legal classification of gig workers is still being debated, with companies classifying their workers as "independent contractors", while organized labor advocates have been lobbying for them to be classified as "employees", which would legally require companies to provide the full suite of employee benefits like time-and-a-half for overtime, paid sick time, employer-provided health care, bargaining rights, and unemployment insurance, among others. In 2020, the voters in California approved 2020 California Proposition 22, which created a third worker classification whereby gig-worker-drivers are classified as contractors but get some benefits, such as minimum wage, mileage reimbursement, and others.

Etymology of gig
Gig has various meanings in English, including a kind of boat and a forked spear, but it has two main, modern, informal meanings: any paid job or role, especially for a musician or a performer and any job, especially one that is temporary.

Gig's origin is uncertain. The earliest usage of the word gig in the sense of "any, usual temporary, paid job" is from a 1952 piece by Jack Kerouac about his gig as a part-time brakeman for the Southern Pacific railroad.

Background 
In the 2000s, the digital transformation of the economy and industry developed rapidly due to the development of information and communication technologies such as the Internet and the popularization of smartphones. As a result, on-demand platforms based on digital technology have created jobs and employment forms that are differentiated from existing offline transactions by the level of accessibility, convenience and price competitiveness. In general, "work" is described as a full-time worker with set working hours, including benefits. But the definition of work began to change with changing economic conditions and continued technological advances, and the change in the economy created a new labor force characterized by independent and contractual labor.

Uberisation or uberization is a neologism describing the commercialization of an existing service industry by new participants using computing platforms, such as mobile applications, in order to aggregate transactions between clients and providers of a service, often bypassing the role of existing intermediaries as part of the so-called platform economy. This business model has different operating costs compared to a traditional business. The term is derived from the company name "Uber". Uberisation has also raised concerns over government regulations and taxation, insofar as the formalised application of the sharing economy has led to disputes over the extent to which the provider of services via an uberised platform should be held accountable to corporate regulations and tax obligations. Uberised business formats are characterised by the use of a digitalised platform enabling peer-to-peer, or quasi-peer to peer transactions, minimising the distance between the provider and customer of a service, the use of a rating system for the quality of the service provided by a provider.

In 2018, 36% of U.S. workers joined in the gig economy through either their primary or secondary jobs. The number of people working in major economies is generally less than 10 percent of the economically viable population, according In Europe, 9.7 percent of adults from 14 EU countries participated in the gig economy in 2017, according to the survey. Meanwhile, it is estimated that gig worker's size, which covers independent or non-conventional workers, is 20% to 30% of the economically active population in the United States and Europe.

A 2016 study by the McKinsey Global Institute concluded that, across America and England, there were a total of 162 million people that were involved in some type of independent work. Moreover, their payment is linked to the gigs they perform, which could be deliveries, rentals or other services.

Because a lot of gig work can be done online, gig workers find themselves competing with one another in a 'planetary labour market'.

Distinctions

Temporary workers 

Many factors go into a desirable job, and the best employers focus on the aspects of work that are most attractive to today's increasingly competitive and fluid labor force. Traditional workers have long term employer–employee relationship in which the worker is paid by the hour or year, earning a wage or salary. Outside of that arrangement, work tends to be temporary or project-based workers are hired to complete a particular task or for certain period of time. Coordination of jobs through an on-demand company reduces entry and operating costs for providers and allows workers' participation to be more transitory in gig markets (i.e., they have greater flexibility around work hours). Freelancers sell their skills to maximize their freedom, while full-time gig workers leverage platforms to level up their skills.

Gig work vs. zero-hour contract employment 
It is important to distinguish employment in the sharing economy from employment through zero-hour contracts, a term primarily used in the United Kingdom to refer a contract in which an employer is not obliged to provide any minimum number of working hours to an employee. Employment in the gig economy entails receiving compensation for one key performance indicator, which, for example, is defined as parcels delivered or taxi lifts conducted. Another feature is that employees can opt to refuse taking an order. Although employers do not have to guarantee employment or employees can also refuse to take an order under a zero-hour contract, workers under such a contract are paid by the hour and not directly through business-related indicators as in the case of the gig economy.

Advantages and disadvantages  
Gig workers have high levels of flexibility, autonomy, task variety, and complexity. The gig economy has also raised some concerns. First, these jobs generally confer few employer-provided benefits and workplace protections. Second, technological developments occurring in the workplace have come to blur the legal definitions of the terms "employee" and "employer" in ways that were unimaginable when employment regulations in the United States like the Wagner Act of 1935 and the Fair Labor Standards Act of 1938 were written. These mechanisms of control can result in low pay, social isolation, working unsocial and irregular hours, overwork, sleep deprivation and exhaustion.

According to a 2021 report by the World Health Organization and the International Labour Organization the expansion of the gig economy can be seen as one significant factor for the increase in worker deaths for those who work over 55 hours a week (relative to those who work 35–40), rising from 600,000 deaths in 2000 to 750,000 in 2016.  The report found that in 2016, 9% of the world's population worked greater than 55 hours weekly, and this was more prevalent among men, as well as workers in the Western Pacific and South-East Asia regions. Work has also suggested poor mental health outcomes amongst gig workers.

Legislatures have adopted regulations intended to protect gig economy workers, mainly by forcing employers to provide gig workers with benefits normally reserved for traditional employees. Critics of such regulations have asserted that these obligations have negative consequences, with employers almost inevitably reducing wages to compensate for the increased benefits or even terminating employment when they have no leeway to reduce wages.

Gender and gig work 
There are several gender differences within gig work from the number of women who are participating to the wage pay gap.  Globally, the gender differences in participation of women in the gig economy differ. For example, in the United States, female gig workers make up 55% of the gig work population  while in India, about 28% of gig workers are women.

Gender and type of work 
Gig work has witnessed similar gendered division that exist within traditional work. The platform economy has particularly attracted female service providers due to the flexibility it offers. For example, 80% of women on DoorDash said that flexibility is the main reason they pursue gig work. One reason for this is that many women need to balance work with familial responsibilities and are therefore more likely than men to participate in gig work due to scheduling reasons.

However, there has been a recent rise in women joining the delivery economy. Women now make up just under half of the delivery people on the Uber Eats platform. Aside from the flexibility, women tend to prefer delivery work to ride-sharing work because of safety concerns in being a female driver in ride-sharing services. There has been various accounts of sexual harassment claims filed by female Uber drivers. Safety concerns contribute to the type of gig work female workers may choose to engage in.

Gender and pay 
The literature on the gender pay gap in platform economies is mixed. But many studies show that women continue to earn less than men, even in platform-based economies.

Age and gig work in the United States 
Eligible workers of all ages participate in the gig economy. The highest percentage of Americans who report having earned money at least once via gig work found through an online platform are those between the ages of 18 and 29, at 30%. Participation drops to 18% for individuals between 30 and 49 years of age, and lower than that for individuals 50 and older.  The consulting firm McKinsey attributes the difference in participation by age in part to the low barrier of entry into gig work as young adults are still developing marketable skill sets for other lines of work.

Interestingly, the American Enterprise Institute (AEI) finds that despite the general decline in gig workforce participation with age, approximately 20% of retired Americans participate in the gig economy, primarily by performing services such as tutoring, rental hosting, caring for pets, and ride-hail driving. AEI states that the increase in gig work participation following retirement is due in part to fear of financial preparedness for retirement, given the increase in life expectancy or the effect of economic decline on the value of retirement accounts. However, AEI also cites boredom as a significant reason for participation, with 96% of gig workers over 65 claiming they feel more fulfilled in life when they maintain a job they enjoy.

Race and gig work in the United States 
Gig work participation also differs between races in the United States. More non-white Americans report having earned money in the gig economy – 30% of Hispanic adults, 20% of Black adults, and 19% of Asian adults - than their white counterparts, at 12%. The differences in participation by race can be explained in part by individuals’ migrant status, as globally, a disproportionate number of migrants report earning money through gig work. 58% of gig workers surveyed said the extra income earned as either “essential” or “important” as opposed to “nice to have." On Uber’s Q2 2022 earnings call, 70% of new Uber drivers cited increased cost of living as the primary motivator to join the company.

In 2021, more non-white gig workers expressed concern about their exposure to COVID-19 on the job, at 50%, than their white counterparts, at 38%. A similar difference between races was found among standard workers with respect to their employer’s lack of COVID-19 precautions.

Future 
Measuring the size of the gig workforce is difficult because of the different definitions of what constitutes "gig work"; limitations in the methods used to collect data via household surveys versus information from business establishments; and differing legal definitions of workers under tax, workplace, and other public policies.

Most importantly, gig work's appearance is not an isolated trend, but is related to wide changes in the economy. Advances in globalization and technology put pressure on companies to respond quickly to market changes. Securing labor through nontraditional agreements such as gig work will enable companies to quickly adjust the size of their workforce. This can help companies increase their profits. From this point of view, the unconventional gig work is a fundamental component of today's economy, and it is unlikely to disappear anytime soon.

In their book, The Gig Economy, Woodcock and Graham outline four pathways worker-friendly futures for the gig economy: increased transparency, better regulation, stronger collective organisation of workers, and platforms run as cooperatives or public infrastructures.

By location

Africa 
When it comes to gig workers in Africa, there are significant variations across different countries. Sub-Saharan Africa comprises 13% of the world's workforce and over 85% of the employment in Africa is considered informal. However, there is limited digital-based gig work compared to other emerging markets such as Southeast Asia.

Asia

South Korea 
Gig work is spreading around the side job and delivery business. Kakao has hired drivers to build a system for proxy driving, and the people of delivery are meeting the surging demand for delivery through a near-field delivery called "Vamin Connect". There is a gig work platform for professional freelancers, not just work. The platform, which connects those who want skilled professionals and those with skills, offers ten kinds of services, including design, marketing, computer programming, translation, document writing and lessons. However, "gig worker" is not yet very welcome in Korea. This is because many "gig workers" have conflicts with existing services and expose the lack of social and legal preparation.

Southeast Asia 
Gig work in Southeast Asia has been rapidly growing since 2010; based on World Bank estimates in 2019, the gig work population has seen a consistent 30% annual growth rate.

Although there is already a large informal sector in many Southeast Asian countries, the growing number of gig workers in Southeast Asia means that there is growing demand for labor regulations to protect workers against unfair labor practices. The pandemic has highlighted this concern and shone light on the vulnerability of gig workers in Southeast Asia. In Indonesia, ojek drivers in particular were left with neither a social safety net nor health protection. Under current labor laws, gig workers in Indonesia are not allowed to create a formal labor union, and their organizations are seen as informal communities, making it difficult to voice their demands.

Australia
In Australia, the gig economy include services such as ride sharing, food delivery, and various types of personal services for a fee. It is against the law for an employer to claim a worker as an independent contractor when they are in fact an employee. Where this happens, the business could be liable for penalties under the Fair Work Act, and have to backpay the entitlements.

Europe
When it comes to platform workers in Europe, there are significant differences across countries. The UK has the highest incidence of platform work. Other countries with high relative values are Germany, the Netherlands, Spain, Portugal and Italy. By contrast, Finland, Sweden, France, Hungary and Slovakia show very low values compared to the rest. The typical European platform worker is a young male. A typical platform worker is likely to have a family and kids, and regardless of age, platform workers tend to have fewer years of labour market experience than the average worker. The majority of platform workers provide more than one type of service and are active on two or more platforms. While flexibility and autonomy are frequently mentioned motivations for platform workers, so too is the lack of alternatives.

One controversial issue, though not unique to Europe, is the employment status of platform workers. In most cases the providers of labour services via platforms are formally independent contractors rather than employees, however when asked about their current employment situation, 75.7% of platform workers claimed to be an employee (68.1%) or self-employed (7.6%). The labour market status of platform workers is unclear even to workers themselves, and it also reflects uncertainty surrounding this issue in policy and legal debates around Europe. While platform work can lower the entry barriers to the labour market and facilitate work participation through better matching procedures and easing the working conditions of specific groups, this type of work often relies on a workforce of independent contractors whose conditions of employment, representation and social protection are unclear and often unfavourable.

In most EU states the rules governing contributions and entitlements of social protection schemes are still largely based on full-time open-ended contracts between a worker and a single employer. As a result workers with non-standard arrangements often do not have the same income and social security protection compared to workers with standard employer-employee contracts. Modern social protection systems should be adapted to a context of more irregular careers and frequent transitions, linking entitlements to individuals rather than jobs may contribute to this, while fostering mobility and mitigating the social cost of labour market adjustments.

United Kingdom 
In some jurisdictions, legal rulings have classified full-time freelancers working for a single main employer of the gig economy as workers and awarded them regular worker rights and protection. An example is the October 2016 ruling against Uber in the case of Uber BV v Aslam, which supported the claim of two Uber drivers to be classified as workers and to receive the related worker rights and benefits.

In 2019, the UK Supreme Court provided guidance on the correct way to categorize "gig economy" workers. The London-based company Pimlico Plumbers lost an appeal against the argument that one of its plumbers was a "worker", i.e. not an employee, but enjoying some "employment" rights such as holiday pay and sickness pay. The Employment Appeals Tribunal ruled that Hermes' couriers are "workers" with certain statutory benefits including minimum wage, rest periods and holiday pay. In 2018, Uber lost a court case which claimed drivers are workers and therefore entitled to workers' rights, including the national minimum wage and paid holiday. Another UK company involved in "worker status" legal cases is CitySprint. On 19 February 2021, the Supreme Court ruled in favour of 25 Uber drivers having "worker status"; the publication Personnel Today suggests that this case establishes "once and for all that in the UK the self-employed app-based driver model is no longer viable".

Many "gig economy workers" have not been able to receive COVID-19 pandemic support funding.

Latin America and Caribbean

Brazil 
The precarity of work, with the growth of digital applications for the delivery of goods and services, a phenomenon popularly known as uberization, despite being occurring in several countries around the world, has gained strength in Brazil, a country affected by deindustrialization and dependence on the service sector.

Despite promises from Brazilian government authorities to create new laws to regulate the activity, the absence of a specific regulation covering this new form of relationship between Brazilian companies and gig workers has increased legal uncertainty and been a source of social conflicts.

In 2020, there was a national strike bringing together delivery workers coordinated by a set of social movements, such as the Entregadores Antifascistas, a collective organisation of gig workers, which mobilized a set of actions and drew the attention of Brazilian society to the problem.

According to IPEA, a government-led research agency, it was estimated that in October 2021, gig workers numbered 1.4 million people in Brazil.

United States 
In 2015 nearly one-in-ten Americans (8%) have earned money using digital platforms to take on a job or task. Meanwhile, nearly one-in-five Americans (18%) have earned money by selling something online, while 1% have rented out their properties on a home-sharing site. Adding up everyone who has performed at least one of these three activities, some 24% of American adults have earned money in the "platform economy" in 2015.

In 2022, the U.S. Department of Labor released a proposal to revise the Department’s guidance on how to determine who is an employee or independent contractor under the Fair Labor Standards Act (FLSA). The proposed rule would make it easier for gig workers/independent contractors to gain full employee status. Companies would be required to provide rights and benefits to gig workers/independent contractors equivalent to standard employees. These benefits include minimum wage, health insurance, social security contributions, and unemployment insurance. The rule would replace a previous one enacted under the Trump administration that made it more difficult for a gig worker/independent contractor to be classified as an employee.

California
In 2019, the California legislature passed a law (AB 5) requiring all companies to re-classify their gig-workers from "independent contractors" to "employees".  (In the US, there are two mutually exclusive employee classifications; the following ballot initiative created a third in California.) In response to AB 5, app-based ride-sharing and delivery companies Uber, Lyft, DoorDash, Instacart, and Postmates created a ballot initiative (2020 California Proposition 22), which won with 60% of the vote and exempted them from providing the full suite of mandated employee benefits (time-and-a-half for overtime, paid sick time, employer-provided health care, bargaining rights, and unemployment insurance - among others) while instead giving drivers new protections of:

120 percent of the local minimum wage for each hour a driver spends driving (with passenger or en route), but not time spent waiting  
$0.30/mile for expenses for each mile driven with passenger or en route
health insurance stipend for drivers who average more than 15 hours per week driving
requires the companies to pay medical costs and some lost income for drivers hurt while driving or waiting
prohibits workplace discrimination and requires that companies: develop sexual harassment policies, conduct criminal background checks, and mandate safety training for drivers

See also 
False self-employment
Informal economy
List of gig economy companies
Platform economy
Precarious work
Precarity
Precariat
Tang ping ("Lying flat")

References

Temporary employment
Sharing economy
Occupational safety and health